2003 in Russian football saw the first title for PFC CSKA Moscow. Spartak Moscow, the Cup winners, had the worst league finish since 1976. The national team qualified for Euro 2004.

National team
Russia national football team qualified for the Euro 2004. After finishing second to Switzerland in group 10, Russia overcame Wales in play-offs.

 Russia score given first

Key
 H = Home match
 A = Away match
 N = Neutral ground
 F = Friendly
 FT = Friendly tournament
 ECQ = 2004 UEFA European Football Championship qualifying, Group 10
 ECQP = 2004 UEFA European Football Championship qualifying, play-off

Leagues

Premier League

First Division

The First Division was extended from 18 teams in 2005 to 22. Amkar and Kuban won the promotion on the dramatic final day of the season, leaving Terek and Tom in the First Division.

Aleksandr Panov of Dynamo SPb became the top goalscorer with 23 goals.

Second Division
The Ural and Povolzhye zones of the Second Division were merged because of low number of clubs. The following clubs have earned promotion by winning tournaments in their respective zones:
 FC Arsenal Tula (West)
 FC Oryol (Centre)
 FC Dynamo Makhachkala (South)
 FC KAMAZ Naberezhnye Chelny (Ural-Povolzhye)
 FC Luch-Energia Vladivostok (East)

Cups
In a newly introduced Russian Super Cup Lokomotiv overcame CSKA 4–3 on penalties after the match ended 1–1. The match was held at the newly reconstructed Lokomotiv Stadium.

The Russian Cup was won by Spartak Moscow, who beat Rostov in the final 1–0.

UEFA club competitions

2002–03 UEFA Champions League
Lokomotiv Moscow participated in the second group stage of the 2002–03 UEFA Champions League, where they finished fourth with just one point in a group which included A.C. Milan, Real Madrid, and Borussia Dortmund.

2003–04 UEFA Champions League
CSKA Moscow were unsuccessful in the 2003–04 UEFA Champions League, as they lost in the second qualifying round to FK Vardar 2–3 on aggregate.

Lokomotiv Moscow beat FC Shakhtar Donetsk to qualify for the group stage. They finished second in a group with Arsenal F.C., Internazionale Milano F.C., and FC Dynamo Kyiv. Lokomotiv were level on points with Inter but qualified for the knock-out rounds thanks to a 3–0 home win and away draw.

2003–04 UEFA Cup
Torpedo Moscow beat F.C. Domagnano 9–0 on aggregate in the qualifying round. In the first round, they needed a penalty shootout to overcome PFC CSKA Sofia. In the second round, Torpedo lost 1–2 on aggregate to Villarreal CF.

Spartak Moscow knocked out Esbjerg fB and Dinamo București in the first two rounds and qualified for the spring phase of the competition.

References
National team fixtures 
League and cup results
UEFA Champions League results: 2002–03  2003–04 
UEFA Cup results

 
Seasons in Russian football